The Department of Home and Territories was an Australian government department that existed between November 1916 and December 1928.

Scope
Information about the department's functions and/or government funding allocation could be found in the Administrative Arrangements Orders, the annual Portfolio Budget Statements and in the Department's annual reports.

At its creation, the Department dealt with:
Astronomy
Census and Statistics
Elections
Franchise
Immigration and Emigration
Influx of Criminals
Lands and Surveys
Meteorology
Naturalization and Aliens
Pearl Shelling and Trepang fisheries in Australian waters beyond Territorial limits
People of races (other than the Aboriginal races in any State) for whom it is deemed necessary to make special laws
Seat of government
Territories forming part of the Commonwealth

Structure
The Department was an Australian Public Service department, staffed by officials who were responsible to the Minister for Home and Territories.

References

Ministries established in 1916
Home and Territories